was a samurai and Imperial Prince during Japan's Heian period, one of the progenitors of the Seiwa Genji branch of the Minamoto clan. He was a son of Sadazumi-shinnō and grandson of Emperor Seiwa. Legend has it that Tsunemoto, in his childhood, was called Rokusonnō, with "roku" (六, six) meaning that his father was the sixth son of Emperor Seiwa, and "son" (孫, "grandson") meaning that he was a grandson of the Emperor. He was also the predecessor of Takeda ryu.

Tsunemoto took part in a number of campaigns for the Imperial Court, including those against Taira no Masakado in 940 and against Fujiwara no Sumitomo the following year.

He held the title of Chinjufu-shōgun, or Commander-in-chief of the Defense of the North, and was granted the clan name of Minamoto by the Emperor in 961, the year he died.

Tsunemoto was the father of Minamoto no Mitsunaka.

Family
 Father: Sadazumi-shinnō (貞純親王, 873?-916), "Prince Sadazumi", son of Emperor Seiwa
 Mother: Minamoto no Harako (源柄子), daughter of Minamoto no Yoshiari (源能有), son of Emperor Montoku
 Wife: daughter of Tachibana no Shigefuru (橘繁古女) or daughter of Fujiwara no Toshinari (藤原敏有女)
 Son: Minamoto no Mitsunaka (源満仲, 912–997)

Honours
Senior First Rank (December 17, 1701; posthumous)

References

Further reading
Papinot, Edmond (1910). Historical and geographical dictionary of Japan. Tokyo: Librarie Sansaisha.

Minamoto clan
Japanese princes
People of Heian-period Japan
894 births
961 deaths
Deified Japanese people